Danilo Samaniego (born 22 December 1964) is retired football player from Ecuador, he played as a defender during his career.

Career
Samaniego began his career with L.D.U. Quito in 1982, he also played for Deportivo Quito.

Honours

 L.D.U. Quito
 Ecuadorian Serie A: 1990, 1998

References

External links
 Danilo Samaniego at National Football Teams

1964 births
Living people
Ecuadorian footballers
Footballers from Quito
Ecuador international footballers
Ecuadorian Serie A players
L.D.U. Quito footballers
S.D. Quito footballers
Association football defenders